The Crown of João VI, also known as the Portuguese Royal Crown (Coroa Real de Portugal) is the most recent and only extant crown of the Portuguese Crown Jewels.

Description

The crown is fashioned out of gold, silver, iron, and red velvet.  Its eight half arches are surmounted by a monde: a globus cruciger on a crown, with a cross at its top—as Portugal was a Catholic nation. The base of the crown is elaborately decorated with baroque patterns and designs.

History
The Crown of João VI was made in 1817 for the acclamation of King João VI. The crown was fashioned in the workshop of D. Antonio Gomes da Silva, the Royal Jeweler. 

The crown was made as part of the set of crown jewels, which included the Sceptre of the Armillary and the Mantle of João VI, which was specifically made for João VI's acclamation. It then became the official crown of the monarchs of Portugal and was used by all the Portuguese monarchs after João VI.

Though serving as the monarchy's official symbol, the crown was never actually worn by any Portuguese monarch.  In 1646, King John IV of Portugal had consecrated the Crown of Portugal to the Virgin Mary; following this, no Portuguese sovereign ever wore a diadem, though it was usually present at the ceremony where his ascension was proclaimed. 

The crown saw its last official use during the reign of Manuel II of Portugal, when it was used for his acclamation and at the official opening of the Cortes, the Portuguese parliament.

The Crown of João VI, along with all the other Portuguese Crown Jewels, are kept in the Ajuda National Palace, in Lisbon.

See also
Portuguese Crown Jewels
Mantle of João VI
Sceptre of the Armillary

References

External links
Jóias da Coroa Portuguesa

Portuguese Crown Jewels
Portuguese monarchy
Joao